Sean F. Haggerty (born February 11, 1976) is an American former professional ice hockey left winger. He played 14 games in the National Hockey League with the Toronto Maple Leafs, New York Islanders, and Nashville Predators between 1996 and 2000. The rest of his career, which lasted from 1996 to 2002, was spent in the minor leagues. Internationally Haggerty played for the American national team at both the junior and senior level, including the 2000 World Championship.

Biography
Haggerty was born in Rye, New York. As a youth, he played in the 1989 and 1990 Quebec International Pee-Wee Hockey Tournaments with a minor ice hockey team from Rye, New York.

Haggerty was drafted in the second round, 48th overall, by the Toronto Maple Leafs in the 1994 NHL Entry Draft. He played fourteen games in the National Hockey League: one with the Maple Leafs in the 1995–96 season, ten with the New York Islanders over two seasons, and three with the Nashville Predators in the 2000–01 season.

Career statistics

Regular season and playoffs

International

References

External links
 

1976 births
Living people
American men's ice hockey left wingers
Detroit Junior Red Wings players
Detroit Whalers players
Ice hockey players from New York (state)
Kansas City Blades players
Kentucky Thoroughblades players
Lowell Lock Monsters players
Milwaukee Admirals (IHL) players
Nashville Predators players
New York Islanders players
People from Rye, New York
Providence Bruins players
Toronto Maple Leafs draft picks
Toronto Maple Leafs players
Worcester IceCats players